Ali Bey, Prince of Dulkadir (modern Turkish: Şehsüvaroğlu Ali Bey, Ottoman Turkish شهسوار اوغلی علی بك, Sehsüvâr-oġlı ‘Alî Beg) (d. 1522), was a governor of Dulkadir Eyalet, appointed by the Ottoman sultan Selim I. After resisting threats to his authority, he fell under suspicion of treason by Selim and was removed as governor in 1522.

Governor of Dulkadir
Ali Bey, nephew of the Emirate of Dulkadir bey Alaüddevle Bozkurt, enters into the pages of history in 1515, after the former Emirate of Dulkadir was taken from the Mamluks by the Ottoman Empire. After the victory, Ali Bey was appointed governor of the now province by the Ottoman sultan Selim I, and Alaüddevle's head was delivered to the city of Cairo.

In early 1520, Şah Ismail of Persia gave tacit approval to an uprising in Anatolia by the Kızılbaş, a Shia militant group. Known as the Şah Veli uprising because of the involvement of a Kızılbaş leader in the Ottoman province of Sivas named Şah Veli, it soon became so problematic to Anatolia that the governor of Sivas wrote to Selim for help. The Kızılbaş had many members within its ranks that were associated with the former Dulkadirid rulers who opposed Ali Bey. After two successive defeats at the hands of the Ottoman Army, Şah Veli was brought to Ali Bey and dismembered for all to see. This execution was meant to warn anyone who threatened Ali Bey that support for the Shia Kızılbaş was not to be tolerated under any circumstances. In 1522, he was removed as governor by Selim I after being accused of treason.

References

Muslim monarchs
Turkic rulers
16th-century deaths
1522 deaths
Dulkadirids